The Mexican Secretariat for Home Affairs is the public department concerned with the country's domestic affairs, the presenting of the president's bills to Congress, their publication on the Official Journal of the Federation, and certain issues of national security. The country's principal intelligence agency, CISEN, is directly answerable to the Secretary of the Interior. The Secretary is a member of the President's Cabinet and is, given the constitutional implications of the post, the most important Cabinet Member. Additionally, in case of absolute absence  of the President, the Secretary of Interior assumes the executive powers of the President provisionally. The Office is practically equivalent to Ministries of the Interior in most other countries (with the exception of the that of the United States of America) and is occasionally translated to English as Ministry, Secretariat or Department of the Interior.

History 

In 1821, after the establishment of what was then the Mexican Provisional Cabinet (Junta Gubernativa Provisional), and given public urgings to organise the country's government, regulation was produced outlining the functions of a new governmental arm, then styled The Office for Domestic and Foreign Affairs. The new agency was answerable for managing the functioning of the government in general. The first person to take up the Directorship of the Office was José Manuel de Herrera who held the post between 1821 and 1823. Later on, it became necessary to particularise the duties of certain government agencies, which, in 1843, lead to the creation of the 'Office for Home Affairs' (also styled 'Department of the Interior'), which would later be re-styled as the 'Office for Foreign Relations and Government' in 1841 and then again in 1843 as the 'Office for Home Affairs and Policing'. The Office eventually had some of its powers separated into other ministries and, in 1853, was once again named 'Office for Home Affairs' —as it is still called up to the present day.

The Office for Home Affairs in its modern day form, is concerned principally with the good management and proper application of the policies of Mexico's Federal Government within its national borders.

It is a department of the national executive branch, whose origins date back to article 222 of the 1812 Spanish Constitution, which received royal assent on 19 March 1812. Among the Cabinet Secretaries mentioned in the constitution, were those of Governance of the Realm in the Peninsula and Adjacent Islands and Governance of the Realm Overseas. On 22 October 1814, the Constitutional Declaration for the Emancipation of the Mexican Americas known as the Apatzingán Constitution made provisions for a republican form of Government by way of Article 134. The Apatzingán Constitution provided for an Executive Branch known as the Supreme Government which would be equipped with an Department for Home Affairs, among other governmental departments.

Political significance

This position was historically seen as being a heartbeat away from the Presidency, because several Secretaries of the Interior were chosen as presidential candidates for the following term by incumbent presidents Plutarco Elías Calles, Emilio Portes Gil, Lázaro Cárdenas, Miguel Alemán Valdés, Adolfo Ruiz Cortines, Gustavo Díaz Ordaz, Luis Echeverría. Francisco Labastida, Secretary of the Interior during the latter part of the Zedillo government, was seen as Zedillo's personal favorite during the Institutional Revolutionary Party's primaries (the first the party would ever hold) and during his unsuccessful bid which saw his political undoing at the hands of PAN candidate Vicente Fox. In turn, Fox's Secretary of the Interior, Santiago Creel, ran in the National Action Party's primaries in 2006, but was defeated by Felipe Calderón.

Functions
According to the Organic Law of the Federal Public Administration in its Article 27 the department is responsible for the discharge of the following functions and duties assigned:
To present before the Congress of the Union the initiatives of law or decree of the Executive
To publish the laws and decrees of the Congress of the Union, one of the two Chambers or the Standing Commission and the regulations issued by the President of the Republic, as well as the resolutions and provisions that by law must be published in the Official Journal of the Federation
Manage and publish the Official Journal of the Federation
Managing the National Personal Identification Service
To deal with the administrative procedure for the expulsion of foreigners from the national territory
To administer the islands of federal jurisdiction, except those whose administration corresponds, by provision of the law, to another dependence or entity of the federal public administration
Conduct the internal policy that is the responsibility of the Executive and not explicitly attributed to another dependency
To monitor the compliance of constitutional precepts by the authorities of the country, especially with regard to individual guarantees and to issue the necessary administrative measures for that purpose
Conduct, as long as this power is not conferred on another Secretariat, the relations of the Executive Power with the other Powers of the Union, with the autonomous constitutional organs, with the governments of the federative entities, the municipalities and with the other federal and local authorities, As well as render the official information of the Federal Executive
To conduct, within the scope of its competence, the political relations of the Executive Power with national political parties and groups, with social organizations, with religious associations and other social institutions
Foster political development, contribute to the strengthening of democratic institutions; Promote active citizen participation and favor conditions that allow the construction of political agreements and social consensus so that, in terms of the Constitution and laws, the conditions of democratic governance
Monitor compliance with constitutional and legal provisions in matters of public worship, churches, religious groups and associations
To administer the General Archive of the Nation, as well as to monitor the fulfillment of the legal dispositions in matter of information of public interest
To monitor, through the General Directorate of Radio, Television and Cinematography, that printed publications and radio and television transmissions, as well as cinematographic films, remain within the limits of respect for privacy, peace and Public morality and personal dignity, and do not attack the rights of third parties, nor cause the commission of any crime or disturb public order
To regulate, authorize and supervise the game, the bets, the lotteries and raffles, in the terms of the relative laws
Conduct and implement, in coordination with the authorities of the state governments, of Mexico City, with the municipal governments, and with the dependencies and entities of the Federal Public Administration, the policies and programs of civil protection of the Executive, Within the framework of the National System of Civil Protection, for the prevention, assistance, recovery and support of the population in disaster situations and to agree with institutions and organizations of the private and social sectors, actions leading to the same objective
Establish and operate a research and information system, which contributes to preserving the integrity, stability and permanence of the Mexican State
To contribute in what corresponds to the Executive of the Union, to give sustenance to the national unity, to preserve the social cohesion and to strengthen the institutions of government
Compile and systematize the laws, international treaties, regulations, decrees, agreements and federal, state and municipal regulations, as well as establish the corresponding database, in order to provide information through electronic data systems

List of secretaries

Sources

See also 

 Interior minister

External links 
Official Website of the Interior
Official site of the President's Cabinet

Interior, Secretary of

Interior
Mexico
1853 establishments in Mexico